Mano Mano 2: Ubusan ng Lakas is a 2001 Philippine action film starring Ronnie Ricketts, who wrote and directed the film under the name Ronn Rick. It is the sequel to the 1995 film Mano Mano.

Cast
 Ronnie Ricketts as Aldo
 Mariz as Laura
 Klaudia Koronel as Julia
 Dick Israel as Morales
 Rez Cortez as Tata Delfin
 Rommel Montano as Basco
 Maritess Samson as Dexter
 Dinky Doo Jr. as George
 Edgar Mande as Gonzales
 Alvin Anson as Rodel
 Czarina Lopez as Cecille
 Alex Canunguran as Fred
 Bruce Ricketts as Boyet
 Noreen Aguas as Ana
 Manjo del Mundo as Anton
 Topher Ricketts as Trainer

References

External links

2001 films
2001 action films
Filipino-language films
Philippine action films
Maverick Films films